Wolf Grigoryevich (Gershkovich) Messing (10 September 1899 – 8 November 1974) was a self-proclaimed psychic, telepath and stage hypnotist.

Early life
Messing was born in the village of Góra Kalwaria, 25 km southeast of Warsaw, at a time when Poland was a territory of the Russian Empire. He claimed that his psychic abilities developed in his early life.

Career
By the time he was a teenager he was performing for the public as a psychic entertainer. Later on in his life he became Stalin's personal 'wizard.'

According to Messing, he was able to broadcast mental suggestions in order to alter people's perceptions.

In the interview with P. Oreshkin, Messing said:

Death
Messing died in hospital, on 8 November 1974, two months before his 75th birthday. He had a successful surgery on the femoral and iliac arteries, but for some unknown reason death occurred within a couple of days after kidney failure and pulmonary edema. He was buried at the "Vostryakovskoe" Jewish cemetery in Moscow.

His life story depicts Wolf Messing: Who Saw through Time TV Mini Series (2009).

Appearances in fiction
Wolf Messing is a major character in Steve Englehart's series of Max August novels, beginning with The Point Man in 1980, and continuing through The Long Man and The Plain Man.

In the hit video strategy game, Command and Conquer: Red Alert 2 as well as its expansion, Yuri's Revenge, the main character of Yuri was heavily influenced in the likeness of Wolf Messing.

Further reading
 Topsy Küppers: Wolf Messing – Hellseher und Magier. Langen/Müller, München 2002.  
 Nagel, Alexandra: Een mysterieuze ontmoeting...: Sai Baba en mentalist Wolf Messing/A mysterious meeting...: Sai Baba and mentalist Wolf Messing, published in Tijdschrift voor Parapsychologie/Journal for parapsychology 368, vol. 72 nr 4, Dec. 2005, pp. 14–17 
English language article by the same author with more or less the same contents Wolf Messing, an enigmatic ‘psychic entertainer’ whom Sathya Sai Baba claims to have encountered

References

1899 births
1974 deaths
People from Góra Kalwaria
19th-century Polish Jews
20th-century Russian people
Telepaths
Clairvoyants
Polish male stage actors
Refugees from Nazi Germany in the Soviet Union
Polish psychics
Polish emigrants to the Soviet Union